Bakayevo (Baqay) is a rural locality (a selo) and the administrative centre of Bakayevsky Selsoviet, Kushnarenkovsky District, Bashkortostan, Russia. The population was 446 as of 2010. There are 8 streets.

Geography 
Bakayevo is located 24 km southwest of Kushnarenkovo (the district's administrative centre) by road. Mavlyutovo is the nearest rural locality.

References 

Rural localities in Kushnarenkovsky District